The Coniocybaceae are the sole family of lichen-forming fungi in the Coniocybales, which itself is the only order in the class Coniocybomycetes. The family was circumscribed by Heinrich Gottlieb Ludwig Reichenbach in 1837. Both the order and the class were proposed by Maria Prieto and Mats Wedin in 2013 after molecular phylogenetics analysis of various calicioid lichens showed that the Coniocybaceae represented an early diverging lineage in the inoperculate ascomycetes.

Genera
Chaenotheca  – 28 spp.
Coniocybe  – 4 spp.
Sclerophora  – 4 spp.

References

Ascomycota
Ascomycota families
Lichen families
Taxa named by Ludwig Reichenbach
Taxa described in 1837